The 1949 National League Division Two was the fourth post-war season of the second tier of motorcycle speedway in Great Britain.

Summary
The League was extended to 12 teams with the addition of new entrants Walthamstow Wolves and Ashfield Giants. Coventry Bees, Southampton Saints and Cradley Heath moved up from Division Three, with Cradley changing their nickname from Cubs to Heathens in the process. Two sides were missing from those that finished the previous season. Birmingham Brummies moved up to Division One and Middlesbrough Bears dropped out, although the promotion and most of their riders moved to the renamed Newcastle Magpies whose riders and promotion in turn had moved to Ashfield

The Division Two Anniversary (League) Cup was discontinued as the expanded league programme gave the teams 44 league fixtures. Bristol Bulldogs retained their title.

Final table

Top Five Riders (League only)

National Trophy Stage Two
 For Stage One - see Stage One
 For Stage Three - see Stage Three

The 1949 National Trophy was the 12th edition of the Knockout Cup. The Trophy consisted of three stages; stage one was for the third division clubs, stage two was for the second division clubs and stage three was for the top tier clubs. The winner of stage one would qualify for stage two and the winner of stage two would qualify for the third and final stage. Bristol won stage two and therefore qualified for stage three.

Second Division qualifying first round

Second Division Qualifying Second round

Second Division Qualifying semifinals

Second Division Qualifying final
First leg

Second leg

See also
List of United Kingdom Speedway League Champions
Knockout Cup (speedway)

References

Speedway National League Division Two
Speedway National League Division 2
1949 in speedway